Kherf (also Romanized as Kharaf) is a village in Markiyeh Rural District, Mirza Kuchek Janghli District, Sowme'eh Sara County, Gilan Province, Iran. At the 2006 census, its population was 116, in 36 families.

References 

Populated places in Sowme'eh Sara County